Umm Mallal (d. 18 october 1023), known as al-Sayyida (princess), was a Zirid princess and a regent of the zirid dynasty for her nephew Al-Mu'izz ibn Badis between 1016 and 1023.

Biography 
Umm Mallal was the daughter of Al-Mansur ibn Buluggin and Badis ibn Mansur's sister. On the death of Badis, she was a tutor of the young prince al-Mu'izz, who was probably under 9 years, and filled with zeal and competence the functions of regent. She was in a way the adoptive mother of al-Mu'izz and raised him. She spent winter with him in al-Mansuriyah and summer in Mahdia. It is she who seems to have chosen his tutor, the famous Abu l-Hasan 'Ali ibn Abi l-Rijal (d. 1034-35) who inculcated him with malikism. She made hubous in favor of the Great Mosque of Kairouan, a wonderful Koran that still exists in part and the deed of incorporation issued before by the Cadi 'Abd al-Rahman ibn Muhammad ibn 'Abd Allah ibn Hashim.

Death 
When she fell ill in 1023, Sharaf al-Dawla Al-Mu'izz ibn Badis visited her daily. He stood at her bedside and allowed his own courtiers and slaves to be near the princess. She died on Thursday, 18 October 1023, Al-Mu'izz led the Salat al-Janazah (funeral prayer) and celebrated the funeral with banners, drums and palanquins, deploying a pump such as had never been seen before. The two zirid princesses, the mother of al-Mu'izz and his sister Umm al-'Ulu attended.

References

Sources 

1023 deaths
11th-century Berber people
11th-century women rulers
Zirid dynasty